Idar Kreutzer (born 29 August 1962) is a Norwegian businessperson.

He holds a siv.øk. degree from the Norwegian School of Economics. From 1986 to 1987 he was a political secretary for Conservative City Commissioner Michael Tetzschner in Oslo. Kreutzer has been with Storebrand since 1992, was a director from 1995 to 2000 and was appointed as chief executive officer in 2000. He was acting CEO after Åge Korsvold left in October 2000, and was hired on a permanent basis in December 2000.

On 7 May 2012, Storebrand announced that Idar Kreutzer would leave Storebrand and join Finance Norway as managing director. His departure will be effective as of 1 June 2012.

References

1962 births
Living people
Norwegian businesspeople
Norwegian School of Economics alumni
Conservative Party (Norway) politicians